Sexy Versus is the third studio album by Al B. Sure! It was his first album released exclusively by Warner Bros. Records, his first two having been released under Uptown Records with Warner Bros. Records handling distribution.

It was not as successful as his previous two albums but still managed to find success on the charts, making it to #41 on the Billboard 200 and #2 on the Top R&B/Hip-Hop Albums. Three singles made it to the Billboard charts: "Natalie," "Right Now," and "I Don't Wanna Cry."

The track "See The Lady" is a remix of the song "Channel J" from his previous album Private Times...and the Whole 9!. The album's second single "Natalie" was written about actress Halle Berry after he saw her in the 1991 film Strictly Business. In 2014, Sure! referred to the success of the album as well as Berry's inspiration for "Natalie" on Twitter.

It was recently revealed that one of the photos inside the booklet of this album in CD format is of Al B Sure! and his ex, Kim Porter, who died on November 16, 2018.

Track listing
All Songs Co-Written By Al B. Sure!
"Right Now" – 5:54 (Kyle West)
"U & I" – 5:43 (Kiyamma Griffin)
"Playing Games" – 6:04 (DeVante Swing)
"Natalie" – 5:54 (West)
"Ooh 4 You Girl (ft. Grand Puba & Chubb Rock)" – 5:54 (Griffin)
"Kick in the Head" (ft. Rakim) – 4:58 (Kevin Deane)
"Turn You Out" (ft. Slick Rick) – 5:56 (Swing)
"See the Lady (ft. Chubb Rock)" – 5:20 (West)
"Thanks 4 a Great Time Last Nite" – 6:35 (Deane)
"I Don't Wanna Cry" – 5:14 (West)
"Die for You (ft. Brione Lathrop)" – 5:31 (West)
"I'll Never Hurt You Again" – 5:53 (West)
"Papes in the End (ft. Greg "To The Head" and Slick Rick)" – 4:11 (Marc Choice, Howie Tee)

Personnel
Al B. Sure! - vocals
Ike Lee III - drum programming
Al B. Sure!, Kevin Deane, Kiyamma Griffin, DeVanté Swing, Kyle West - keyboards
Brione Lathrop, Chubb Rock, Grand Puba, Gregg "To The Head", Kyle West, Rakim, Slick Rick - additional vocals

Production
Executive Producer: Benny Medina
Produced By Al B. Sure!, Kevin Deane, Kiyamma Griffin, Vincent Herbert, DeVanté Swing, Howie Tee & Kyle West
Engineers: Steven Ett, Michael Gilbert, Paul Logus
Assistant Engineers: Louis Alfred III
Mixing: Al B. Sure!, Steven Ett, Michael Gilbert, Mick Guzauski
Mix Assistants: Andrew Godsberg, Gil Morales
Editing: Al B. Sure!, Michael Gilbert
Mastering: Herb Powers

Charts

Weekly charts

Year-end charts

References

External links
[ Sexy Versus at allmusic]

Al B. Sure! albums
1992 albums
Warner Records albums
Albums produced by DeVante Swing
Albums produced by Howie Tee
Albums produced by Vincent Herbert